Linghe (凌河) may refer to the following places in China:

Linghe District, a district of Jinzhou, Liaoning
Linghe Subdistrict, a subdistrict in Shuangta District, Zhaoyang, Liaoning
Linghe, Shandong, a town in Anqiu, Shandong

See also
Linhe (disambiguation)